Rasgulla (literally "syrup filled roll") is a syrupy dessert popular in the eastern part of South Asia. It is made from ball-shaped dumplings of chhena and semolina dough, cooked in light sugar syrup made of sugar. This is done until the syrup permeates the dumplings.

The earliest evidence of rasagola can be found in the epic poem Dandi Ramayana which was composed by famous Odia poet Balarama Dasa in which he mentioned that rasagola is offered to Maa Laxmi by Lord Jagannath in a ritual called Niladri Bije.

While it is near-universally agreed upon that the dessert originated in the eastern Indian subcontinent, the exact locus of origin is disputed between locations such as West Bengal, Bangladesh, and Odisha, where it is offered at the Puri Jagannath Temple.

In 2016, the West Bengal government applied for a geographical indication (GI) tag for the variant called "Banglar rosogolla" (Bengali rasgulla) clarifying that the Bengal and Odisha variants were different in "both in colour, texture, taste, juice content and method of manufacturing."

In 2017, when West Bengal got its rosogolla's Geographical indication status, the Registry office of India clarified that West Bengal was given GI status for Banglar rosogolla and Odisha can claim it too if they cite the place of origin of their variant along with colour, texture, taste, juice content and method of manufacturing. Thus, in 2018, the government of Odisha applied for GI status for "Odisha Rasagola" (Odia Rasagola), which was approved by GI Registry of India and on July 29, 2019.

Names 
Rasgulla is derived from the words ras ("juice") and gulla ("ball"). Other names for the dish include, Rasagulla, Rossogolla, Roshogolla, Rasagola, Rasagolla, and Rasbhari or Rasbari (Nepali).

History

Claims of Puri temple tradition of Odisha (15th cen.) 
According to historians of Odisha, the rasgulla originated in Puri, as khira mohana, which later evolved into the Pahala rasgulla. It has been traditionally offered as bhog to goddess Lakshmi at Jagannath Temple, Puri. According to the local legend, Laxmi gets upset because her husband Lord Jagannath goes on a 9-day sojourn (the ratha yatra) without her consent. So, she locks Jai Vijay Dwar, one of the temple gates and prevents his convoy from re-entering the sanctum sanctorum of the temple. To appease her, Jagannath offers her rasgullas. This ritual, known as Bachanika, is part of the "Niladri Bije" (or "Arrival of the God") observance, which marks the return of the deities to the temple after the Ratha Yatra.

The Jagannath Temple scholars such as Laxmidhar Pujapanda and researchers like Jagabandhu Padhi state that the tradition has existed since the 12th century, when the present-day temple structure was first built. Pujapanda states that the Niladri Bije tradition is mentioned in Niladri Mahodaya, which is dated to the 18th century by Sarat Chandra Mahapatra. According to Mahapatra, several temple scriptures, which are over 300 years old, provide the evidence of rasgulla offering ritual in Puri.

According to folklore, Pahala (a village on the outskirts of Odisha's capital Bhubaneshwar) had a large number of cows. The village would produce excess milk, and the villagers would throw it away when it became spoilt. When a priest from the Jagannath Temple saw this, he taught them the art of curdling, including the recipe for rasagulla. Pahala thus went on to become the biggest market for chhena-based sweets in the area.

According to Asit Mohanty, an Odia research scholar on Jagannath cult and traditions, the sweet is mentioned as "Rasagola" in the 15th century text Jagamohana Ramayana of Balaram Das. The text mentions Rasagola, along with other sweets found in Odisha. There is also mention of many other cheese made sweets like Chhenapuri, Chhenaladu and Rasabali. Another ancient text Premapanchamruta of Bhupati also mentions cheese (Chhena). It is being argued that cheese making process was well known before coming of Portuguese in Odisha.

According to the Bengali culinary historian Pritha Sen, in the mid-18th century, many Odia cooks were employed in Bengali homes who arguably have introduced Rasgulla along with many other Odia dishes, but there is no substantial claim to prove that. According to another theory, it is possible that the Bengali visitors to Puri might have carried the recipe for rasgulla back to Bengal in the nineteenth century. But no substantial claim regarding that was ever found by any historian or any one else.

This claim is contested by Bengali historians.  According to food historians K. T. Achaya and Chitra Banerji, there are no references to cheese (including chhena) in India before the 17th century. The milk-based sweets were mainly made up of khoa, before the Portuguese influence led to introduction of cheese-based sweets. Therefore, the possibility of a cheese-based dish being offered at Jagannath Temple in the 12th century is highly unlikely. According to Nobin Chandra Das' descendant Animikh Roy and historian Haripada Bhowmik, rasgulla is not even mentioned as one of the chhappan bhog ("56 offerings") in the early records of the Temple; the name of the sweet was coined in Bengal. They also state that it would have been a blasphemy to offer something made from spoiled milk (chhena) to a deity. However, Michael Krondl argues that Hindu dietary rules vary from region to region, and it is possible that this restriction did not exist in present-day Odisha. But at the same time, he could not give any substantial information to uphold the claim which he was forwarding.

Claims of invention in Bengal region (19th cen.)

Claims of invention in West Bengal 
The spongy white rasgulla is believed to have been introduced in present-day West Bengal in 1868 by a Kolkata-based confectioner named Nobin Chandra Das. Das started making rasgulla by processing the mixture of chhena and semolina in boiling sugar syrup in contrast to the mixture sans semolina in the original rasgulla in his sweet shop located at Sutanuti (present-day Baghbazar). His descendants claim that his recipe was an original, but according to another theory, he modified the traditional Odisha rasgulla recipe to produce this less perishable variant.

Yet another theory is that rasgulla was first prepared by someone else in Bengal, and Das only popularized it. In Banglar Khabar (1987), food historian Pranab Ray states that a man named Braja Moira had introduced rasgulla in his shop near Calcutta High Court in 1866, two years before Das started selling the dish. In 1906, Panchana Bandopadhyay wrote that rasgullla was invented in the 19th century by Haradhan Moira, a Phulia-based sweetmaker who worked for the Pal Chowdhurys of Ranaghat. According to Mistikatha, a newspaper published by West Bengal Sweetmeat Traders Association, many other people prepared similar sweets under different names such as gopalgolla (prepared by Gopal Moira of Burdwan district), jatingolla, bhabanigolla and rasugolla. Food historian Michael Krondl states that irrespective of its origin, the rasgulla likely predates Nobin Chandra Das. A sales brochure of the company run by Das' descendants also hints at this: "it is hard to tell whether or not cruder versions of similar sweets existed anywhere at that time. Even if they did, they did not match the quality of Nobin Chandra, and having failed to excite the Bengali palate, they slipped into oblivion."

Bhagwandas Bagla, a Marwari businessman and a customer of Nobin Chandra Das, popularized the Bengali rasgulla beyond the shop's locality by ordering huge amounts.

Claims of Bangladeshi origin
Portuguese settlers made sweet curd cheese and Sandesh-like confections from milk in the sixteenth century, which they brought with them to Bengal. Bengali housewives then improvised the recipe. Late veteran recipe writer and food connoisseur Shawkat Osman told BBC Bangla that ancestors of Nobin Chandra Das, the maker of Rasgulla, were originally from Barisal and they lived near Patuakhali. It is believed that the main origin was formulated in Bangladesh and then became popular in Kolkata.

Modern popularity 
In 1930, the introduction of vacuum packing by Nobin Chandra's son Krishna Chandra Das led to the availability of canned Rasgullas, which made the dessert popular outside Kolkata, and subsequently, outside India. Krishna Chandra's son Sarada Charan Das established the K.C. Das Pvt Ltd company in 1946. Sarada Charan's younger, estranged son Debendra Nath established K.C. Das Grandsons  in 1956.

Today, canned rasgullas are available throughout India, Pakistan and Bangladesh, as well as in South Asian grocery stores outside the Indian subcontinent. In Nepal, Rasgulla became popular under the name Rasbari.

The Indian space agency, ISRO is developing dehydrated rasgullas and other dishes for Indian astronauts in its planned manned missions.

In 2015, the Odisha government initiated a move to get Geographical indication (GI) status for the rasagulla made in Pahala. On 30 July, the people of Odisha celebrated "Rasagola Dibasa" ("Rasgulla Day") to reaffirm Odisha as the place of the dish's origin. In August, West Bengal decided to legally contest Odisha's move to obtain GI Status. In 2015 The odisha state government constituted three committees to claim over the Rasgulla . The committees submitted their interim report to the government. Noted journalist and food researcher Bhakta Tripathy and a member of the committee had submitted dossier containing historical evidence of Rasgulla origin in Odisha. The Science and Technology department of the West Bengal government also started the process to get its own GI status for the dessert.

Rasagola Dibasa 
On 30 July 2015, on the day of "Niladri Bije", a social media campaign was started by using a hashtag #RasagolaDibasa and it later became a mainstream celebration as the maiden day to celebrate Rasgulla's origin to be Odisha. Odia newspaper Sambad and FM radio Radio Choklate in collaboration with the confectioners of Pahala celebrated a rasgulla exhibition-cum-awareness event in Bhubaneswar. Sand artist Sudarshan Patnaik made a sand sculpture in Puri Beach depicting "Niladri Bije" and Jagannath offering rasgulla to Lakshmi.

It has been agreed upon to celebrate the Rasagola Dibasa every year on the tithi of Niladri Bije in the lunar calendar. In the year 2016, the Rasagola Dibasa has been celebrated on 17 July.

Rosogolla Utsob 

To pay tribute to the inventor of rosogolla, ‘Nobin Chandra Das’, and to promote Bengali claim of authenticity over Rosogolla, from 2017 The government of West Bengal has decided to celebrate "Rosogolla Utsob" every year on 28 December. And in 2017 'Rosogolla festival', Bengali confectioners prepared world's largest Rasgulla which weighted 9 kilograms. To celebrate 150 years of Rosogolla's invention, The government of West Bengal had also organized a 3-day grand ‘Rosogolla festival’ from 28 December 2018 to 30 December 2018.

Preparation 
To prepare rasgulla, the cheese (chhena) mixture is formed into small balls. These balls are then simmered in a sugar syrup. It can also be prepared using a pressure cooker or an oven. While serving add a drop of rose water (only organic and edible type of rose water, not rose perfume or synthetic flavors) to enhance the flavor and taste.

Variations 

The Pahal Rasagola from the Pahala area (located between the cities of Bhubaneswar and Cuttack) is also popular in India.

Derivatives and similar desserts 

Along with chhena gaja and chhena poda, rasgulla is one of three traditional Odia chhena desserts. Due to rasgulla becoming associated with Bengali cuisine, the Odisha Milk Federation has tried to popularize chhena poda as the signature Odia dessert.

Nutrition 
Typically, a 100-gram serving of rasgulla contains 186 calories, out of which about 153 calories are in the form of carbohydrates. It also contains about 1.85 grams of fat and 4 grams of protein.

Geographical indication (GI) tag 

In 2015, West Bengal applied for a Geographical Indication (GI) status for "Banglar Rasogolla" (Bengali Rasgulla). The Government clarified that there was no conflict with Odisha, and its application was only for a specific variant which was different in "both in colour, texture, taste, juice content and method of manufacturing" from the variant produced in Odisha. And the same goes for the Odisha Rasgulla, which can be claimed as a variant of the Bengali Rasagulla. On 14 November 2017, the GI Registry of India granted West Bengal the GI status for Banglar Rasogolla.

The GI Registrar office at Chennai later specifically clarified that West Bengal was given GI status only for the Bengali version of Rasgulla ("Banglar Rasogolla"), not for the sweet's origin. The office also stated that Odisha had not by then applied for any GI tag, but it could also get Odisha Rasgulla's GI tag by presenting the necessary evidence.

In 2018 Odisha had applied for GI status in Chennai GI Registry. On 29 July 2019 the GI Registry of India granted Odisha the GI status for Odisha Rasagola.

See also 

 Bangladeshi cuisine
 Bengali cuisine
 Dharwad pedha
 List of Indian sweets and desserts
 Mysore pak
 Odia cuisine

Notes

References 

Indian cuisine
Bengali cuisine
Bangladeshi cuisine
West Bengal cuisine
Indian desserts
Bengali desserts
Sweets of West Bengal
Bangladeshi desserts
Geographical indications in West Bengal
Indian cheese dishes
Nepalese cuisine
Odia cuisine
Mauritian cuisine
Vegetarian dishes of India
Geographical indications in Odisha
Semolina dishes
Cheese desserts